Bunda Street is a shared traffic zone in Canberra, Australia in the Civic shopping area of Civic.  It passes between Northbourne Avenue and Glebe Park. A number of cafes and nightclubs are located on the side of the road, such as Gus's cafe in the Garema Centre. The road passes underneath the Canberra Centre, which bridges the road and ends the shared zone.

History
It was constructed in the early 1950s.

See also

References

External links
Canberra Times article announcing changes

Streets in Canberra